Smithiomyces is a genus of fungi in the family Agaricaceae. It was circumscribed by Rolf Singer in 1944. The type species, S. mexicanus, was formerly placed in Amanita, as well as the now obsolete genera Leucomyces and Venenarius. The genus was named to honor American mycologist Alexander H. Smith.

Species
 Smithiomyces asiaticus 
 Smithiomyces dominicanus 
 Smithiomyces heterosporus 
 Smithiomyces lanosofarinosus 
 Smithiomyces lepiotoides 
 Smithiomyces mexicanus

See also
List of Agaricales genera
List of Agaricaceae genera

References

Agaricaceae
Agaricales genera
Taxa named by Rolf Singer
Taxa described in 1944